Aghkend may refer to:
 Aghnjadzor, Armenia
 Ashotavan, Armenia